Reynir Sigurðsson (1 January 1928 – 13 November 2017) was an Icelandic sprinter. He competed in the men's 400 metres at the 1948 Summer Olympics.

References

1928 births
2017 deaths
Athletes (track and field) at the 1948 Summer Olympics
Reynir Sigurdsson
Reynir Sigurdsson
Place of birth missing